Phyllalia valida is a moth in the family Eupterotidae. It was described by Felder in 1874. It is found in South Africa.

References

Endemic moths of South Africa
Moths described in 1874
Eupterotinae